Belle de Boskoop (also called Goudrenet, Goudreinet or Goudreinnette) is an apple cultivar which originated in Boskoop, Netherlands, where it began as a chance seedling in 1856. Variants include Boskoop red, yellow and green. This rustic apple is firm, tart and fragrant. Greenish-gray tinged with red, the apple stands up well to cooking. Generally Boskoop varieties are very high in acid content and can contain more than four times the vitamin C of Granny Smith or Golden Delicious.

The apple grows well in Normandy, France.

Culture
The cultivar is compatible with most rootstocks, but its pollen quality is poor because it is a triploid. Cultivars that can provide compatible pollen for 'Belle de Boskoop' include Discovery, James Grieve, Melba and Reine des Reinettes. The apple stores well after harvest.

References

External links

Alphen aan den Rijn
Cooking apples
Dutch inventions